My Boo may refer to:

"My Boo" (Ghost Town DJ's song), 1996
"My Boo" (CeCe Peniston song), 2000
"My Boo" (Usher and Alicia Keys song), 2004
"My Boo", a 2008 song by Girlicious, from the album Girlicious
My Boo (album), a 2013 album by Ruslana
My Boo, a 2013 virtual pet game, akin to Pou

See also
Boo (disambiguation)